Antonio Francisco Astiazarán Gutiérrez (born 13 July 1971) is a Mexican politician affiliated with the PRI. He served as Deputy of the LIX and LXII Legislature of the Mexican Congress representing Sonora. He also served as municipal president of Guaymas from 2006 to 2009.

References

1971 births
Living people
People from Guaymas
Institutional Revolutionary Party politicians
21st-century Mexican politicians
Municipal presidents in Sonora
Politicians from Sonora
University of Hermosillo alumni
Alumni of the University of Essex
Deputies of the LXII Legislature of Mexico
Members of the Chamber of Deputies (Mexico) for Sonora